The 1999 Pittsburgh Pirates season was the 118th season of the franchise; the 113th in the National League. This was their 30th season at Three Rivers Stadium. The Pirates finished third in the National League Central with a record of 78–83.

Offseason
 October 15, 1998: Chance Sanford was released by the Pittsburgh Pirates.
 November 17, 1998: Mike Benjamin was signed as a free agent by the Pirates.
 November 18, 1998: Ricardo Rincón was traded by the Pirates to the Cleveland Indians for Brian Giles.
 December 22, 1998: Rafael Bournigal was signed as a free agent by the Pirates.
 March 27, 1999: Rafael Bournigal was released by the Pittsburgh Pirates.
 March 31, 1999: Elmer Dessens was released by the Pirates.

Regular season

Season standings

Game log

|- bgcolor="ffbbbb"
| 1 || April 5 || Expos || 2–9 || Hermanson || Cordova (0–1) || — || 43,405 || 0–1
|- bgcolor="ccffcc"
| 2 || April 6 || Expos || 8–2 || Schmidt (1–0) || Pavano || — || 10,051 || 1–1
|- bgcolor="ffbbbb"
| 3 || April 7 || Expos || 3–4 || Urbina || Loiselle (0–1) || — || 11,377 || 1–2
|- bgcolor="ccffcc"
| 4 || April 9 || Cubs || 2–1 || Benson (1–0) || Sanders || Williams (1) || 19,721 || 2–2
|- bgcolor="ccffcc"
| 5 || April 10 || Cubs || 9–3 || Sauerbeck (1–0) || Woodall || — || 22,479 || 3–2
|- bgcolor="ccffcc"
| 6 || April 11 || Cubs || 9–6 || Schmidt (2–0) || Trachsel || — || 19,384 || 4–2
|- bgcolor="ffbbbb"
| 7 || April 13 || Cardinals || 2–4 || Bottenfield || Schourek (0–1) || Acevedo || 19,724 || 4–3
|- bgcolor="ffbbbb"
| 8 || April 14 || Cardinals || 5–9 || Aybar || Benson (1–1) || — || 18,780 || 4–4
|- bgcolor="ffbbbb"
| 9 || April 16 || @ Reds || 5–6 || Graves || Christiansen (0–1) || — || 17,974 || 4–5
|- bgcolor="ccffcc"
| 10 || April 17 || @ Reds || 7–6 (10) || Christiansen (1–1) || White || — || 15,697 || 5–5
|- bgcolor="ccffcc"
| 11 || April 18 || @ Reds || 4–2 || Loiselle (1–1) || Graves || Williams (2) || 16,667 || 6–5
|- bgcolor="ccffcc"
| 12 || April 19 || @ Padres || 3–0 || Schourek (1–1) || Spencer || Christiansen (1) || 33,616 || 7–5
|- bgcolor="ccffcc"
| 13 || April 20 || @ Padres || 7–3 (10) || Williams (1–0) || Hoffman || — || 15,439 || 8–5
|- bgcolor="ffbbbb"
| 14 || April 21 || @ Padres || 0–2 || Ashby || Schmidt (2–1) || Hoffman || 13,928 || 8–6
|- bgcolor="ffbbbb"
| 15 || April 23 || Brewers || 1–9 || Woodard || Peters (0–1) || — || 13,850 || 8–7
|- bgcolor="ffbbbb"
| 16 || April 24 || Brewers || 3–5 || Reyes || Ritchie (0–1) || Wickman || 15,809 || 8–8
|- bgcolor="ffbbbb"
| 17 || April 25 || Brewers || 2–4 || Karl || Benson (1–2) || Wickman || 17,268 || 8–9
|- bgcolor="ccffcc"
| 18 || April 27 || @ Braves || 5–3 || Schmidt (3–1) || Perez || Williams (3) || 26,990 || 9–9
|- bgcolor="ffbbbb"
| 19 || April 28 || @ Braves || 4–5 || Glavine || Christiansen (1–2) || — || 29,615 || 9–10
|- bgcolor="ffbbbb"
| 20 || April 29 || @ Braves || 1–8 || Maddux || Silva (0–1) || — || 32,017 || 9–11
|- bgcolor="ffbbbb"
| 21 || April 30 || Rockies || 2–7 || Astacio || Schourek (1–2) || — || 17,466 || 9–12
|-

|- bgcolor="ccffcc"
| 22 || May 1 || Rockies || 9–3 || Ritchie (1–1) || Wright || — || 18,599 || 10–12
|- bgcolor="ccffcc"
| 23 || May 2 || Rockies || 8–5 || Schmidt (4–1) || Thomson || Williams (4) || 19,215 || 11–12
|- bgcolor="ccffcc"
| 24 || May 3 || Giants || 9–8 || Loiselle (2–1) || Nen || — || 11,099 || 12–12
|- bgcolor="ffbbbb"
| 25 || May 4 || Giants || 4–7 || Ortiz || Silva (0–2) || — || 10,532 || 12–13
|- bgcolor="ccffcc"
| 26 || May 5 || Giants || 4–3 (12) || Loiselle (3–1) || Rodriguez || — || 14,358 || 13–13
|- bgcolor="ccffcc"
| 27 || May 6 || @ Cardinals || 13–3 || Ritchie (2–1) || Osborne || — || 36,615 || 14–13
|- bgcolor="ffbbbb"
| 28 || May 7 || @ Cardinals || 2–4 || Radinsky || Loiselle (3–2) || — || 39,620 || 14–14
|- bgcolor="ccffcc"
| 29 || May 8 || @ Cardinals || 7–0 || Benson (2–2) || Jimenez || — || 45,790 || 15–14
|- bgcolor="ccffcc"
| 30 || May 9 || @ Cardinals || 12–9 || Peters (1–1) || Aybar || Williams (5) || 45,458 || 16–14
|- bgcolor="ffbbbb"
| 31 || May 10 || @ Astros || 0–6 || Hampton || Schourek (1–3) || — || 17,064 || 16–15
|- bgcolor="ffbbbb"
| 32 || May 11 || @ Astros || 8–19 || Bergman || Ritchie (2–2) || — || 18,450 || 16–16
|- bgcolor="ffbbbb"
| 33 || May 12 || @ Astros || 2–6 || Lima || Schmidt (4–2) || — || 19,792 || 16–17
|- bgcolor="ccffcc"
| 34 || May 14 || Expos || 5–3 || Benson (3–2) || Hermanson || Williams (6) || 24,644 || 17–17
|- bgcolor="ccffcc"
| 35 || May 15 || Expos || 17–6 || Silva (1–2) || Pavano || — || 27,017 || 18–17
|- bgcolor="ccffcc"
| 36 || May 16 || Expos || 9–4 || Schourek (2–3) || Vazquez || — || 28,882 || 19–17
|- bgcolor="ffbbbb"
| 37 || May 17 || @ Braves || 1–2 || Millwood || Ritchie (2–3) || Rocker || 30,673 || 19–18
|- bgcolor="ffbbbb"
| 38 || May 18 || @ Braves || 4–12 || Perez || Schmidt (4–3) || — || 30,858 || 19–19
|- bgcolor="ffbbbb"
| 39 || May 19 || @ Braves || 3–7 || Glavine || Cordova (0–2) || — || 34,106 || 19–20
|- bgcolor="ffbbbb"
| 40 || May 20 || @ Marlins || 3–4 (14) || Alfonseca || Williams (1–1) || — || 11,473 || 19–21
|- bgcolor="ffbbbb"
| 41 || May 21 || @ Marlins || 1–8 || Hernandez || Schourek (2–4) || — || 16,782 || 19–22
|- bgcolor="ccffcc"
| 42 || May 22 || @ Marlins || 11–4 || Ritchie (3–3) || Springer || — || 23,121 || 20–22
|- bgcolor="ccffcc"
| 43 || May 23 || @ Marlins || 6–5 || Wallace (1–0) || Darensbourg || Williams (7) || 19,321 || 21–22
|- bgcolor="ccffcc"
| 44 || May 24 || Mets || 7–4 || Silva (2–2) || Isringhausen || Williams (8) || 11,880 || 22–22
|- bgcolor="ffbbbb"
| 45 || May 25 || Mets || 3–8 || Yoshii || Benson (3–3) || — || 12,029 || 22–23
|- bgcolor="ffbbbb"
| 46 || May 26 || Mets || 2–5 || Hershiser || Schourek (2–5) || Franco || 13,681 || 22–24
|- bgcolor="ccffcc"
| 47 || May 28 || Astros || 6–5 || Ritchie (4–3) || Lima || Williams (9) || 17,309 || 23–24
|- bgcolor="ccffcc"
| 48 || May 29 || Astros || 5–1 || Cordova (1–2) || Reynolds || — || 32,426 || 24–24
|- bgcolor="ccffcc"
| 49 || May 30 || Astros || 7–3 || Benson (4–3) || Hampton || — || 28,905 || 25–24
|- bgcolor="ccffcc"
| 50 || May 31 || Dodgers || 5–4 || Wilkins (1–0) || Arnold || Williams (10) || 15,924 || 26–24
|-

|- bgcolor="ccffcc"
| 51 || June 1 || Dodgers || 4–2 || Schmidt (5–3) || Valdez || Williams (11) || 10,962 || 27–24
|- bgcolor="ccffcc"
| 52 || June 2 || Dodgers || 8–4 || Ritchie (5–3) || Dreifort || — || 20,807 || 28–24
|- bgcolor="ccffcc"
| 53 || June 4 || @ White Sox || 6–3 (11) || Wilkins (2–0) || Simas || — || 12,238 || 29–24
|- bgcolor="ffbbbb"
| 54 || June 5 || @ White Sox || 5–6 || Parque || Benson (4–4) || Foulke || 20,066 || 29–25
|- bgcolor="ffbbbb"
| 55 || June 6 || @ White Sox || 3–4 || Sirotka || Silva (2–3) || Howry || 26,827 || 29–26
|- bgcolor="ffbbbb"
| 56 || June 7 || @ Tigers || 4–9 || Brunson || Schmidt (5–4) || — || 14,280 || 29–27
|- bgcolor="ffbbbb"
| 57 || June 8 || @ Tigers || 4–11 || Cruz || Ritchie (5–4) || — || 15,270 || 29–28
|- bgcolor="ccffcc"
| 58 || June 9 || @ Tigers || 15–3 || Cordova (2–2) || Moehler || — || 15,747 || 30–28
|- bgcolor="ffbbbb"
| 59 || June 11 || Royals || 3–10 || Rosado || Benson (4–5) || — || 31,052 || 30–29
|- bgcolor="ccffcc"
| 60 || June 12 || Royals || 9–8 || Christiansen (2–2) || Whisenant || — || 29,569 || 31–29
|- bgcolor="ccffcc"
| 61 || June 13 || Royals || 8–4 || Schmidt (6–4) || Whisenant || Williams (12) || 28,261 || 32–29
|- bgcolor="ccffcc"
| 62 || June 15 || @ Dodgers || 11–1 || Ritchie (6–4) || Brown || — || 26,284 || 33–29
|- bgcolor="ffbbbb"
| 63 || June 16 || @ Dodgers || 5–6 || Borbon || Clontz (0–1) || Shaw || 25,384 || 33–30
|- bgcolor="ccffcc"
| 64 || June 17 || @ Dodgers || 8–3 || Benson (5–5) || Park || — || 30,888 || 34–30
|- bgcolor="ffbbbb"
| 65 || June 18 || @ Padres || 2–4 || Boehringer || Silva (2–4) || Hoffman || 60,799 || 34–31
|- bgcolor="ffbbbb"
| 66 || June 19 || @ Padres || 4–5 || Cunnane || Schmidt (6–5) || Hoffman || 33,803 || 34–32
|- bgcolor="ffbbbb"
| 67 || June 20 || @ Padres || 3–6 || Clement || Ritchie (6–5) || Hoffman || 25,819 || 34–33
|- bgcolor="ffbbbb"
| 68 || June 22 || @ Phillies || 2–3 || Wolf || Cordova (2–3) || Gomes || 18,835 || 34–34
|- bgcolor="ccffcc"
| 69 || June 23 || @ Phillies || 8–6 || Benson (6–5) || Byrd || Williams (13) || 20,256 || 35–34
|- bgcolor="ffbbbb"
| 70 || June 24 || @ Phillies || 5–7 || Schilling || Silva (2–5) || Gomes || 25,848 || 35–35
|- bgcolor="ccffcc"
| 71 || June 25 || @ Brewers || 5–3 || Schmidt (7–5) || Abbott || Christiansen (2) || 23,958 || 36–35
|- bgcolor="ffbbbb"
| 72 || June 26 || @ Brewers || 4–7 || Nomo || Ritchie (6–6) || Wickman || 26,590 || 36–36
|- bgcolor="ccffcc"
| 73 || June 27 || @ Brewers || 6–5 || Cordova (3–3) || Karl || Christiansen (3) || 23,788 || 37–36
|- bgcolor="ccffcc"
| 74 || June 28 || Phillies || 3–2 (10) || Hansell (1–0) || Montgomery || — || 14,144 || 38–36
|- bgcolor="ffbbbb"
| 75 || June 29 || Phillies || 4–7 || Schilling || Silva (2–6) || — || 16,343 || 38–37
|- bgcolor="ccffcc"
| 76 || June 30 || Phillies || 9–1 || Schmidt (8–5) || Ogea || — || 14,526 || 39–37
|-

|- bgcolor="ccffcc"
| 77 || July 1 || Phillies || 12–7 || Ritchie (7–6) || Person || — || 11,174 || 40–37
|- bgcolor="ffbbbb"
| 78 || July 2 || Brewers || 2–5 || Karl || Cordova (3–4) || Wickman || 20,332 || 40–38
|- bgcolor="ffbbbb"
| 79 || July 3 || Brewers || 4–9 || Pulsipher || Benson (6–6) || — || 28,893 || 40–39
|- bgcolor="ffbbbb"
| 80 || July 4 || Brewers || 3–4 || Weathers || Clontz (0–2) || Wickman || 16,553 || 40–40
|- bgcolor="ffbbbb"
| 81 || July 5 || Cubs || 2–5 || Lieber || Schmidt (8–6) || Aguilera || 19,762 || 40–41
|- bgcolor="ccffcc"
| 82 || July 6 || Cubs || 6–1 || Ritchie (8–6) || Trachsel || — || 14,367 || 41–41
|- bgcolor="ccffcc"
| 83 || July 7 || Cubs || 4–1 || Cordova (4–4) || Mulholland || — || 28,258 || 42–41
|- bgcolor="ffbbbb"
| 84 || July 8 || Cubs || 4–9 || Serafini || Benson (6–7) || Sanders || 17,711 || 42–42
|- bgcolor="ffbbbb"
| 85 || July 9 || @ Twins || 4–5 || Radke || Silva (2–7) || Trombley || 13,427 || 42–43
|- bgcolor="ffbbbb"
| 86 || July 10 || @ Twins || 4–5 || Guardado || Williams (1–2) || — || 14,865 || 42–44
|- bgcolor="ccffcc"
| 87 || July 11 || @ Twins || 10–2 || Ritchie (9–6) || Mays || — || 18,587 || 43–44
|- bgcolor="ffbbbb"
| 88 || July 15 || Indians || 0–2 || Colon || Schmidt (8–7) || Jackson || 39,620 || 43–45
|- bgcolor="ccffcc"
| 89 || July 16 || Indians || 11–3 || Cordova (5–4) || Burba || — || 43,519 || 44–45
|- bgcolor="ccffcc"
| 90 || July 17 || Indians || 13–10 || Benson (7–7) || Nagy || Williams (14) || 43,299 || 45–45
|- bgcolor="ccffcc"
| 91 || July 18 || Dodgers || 6–5 (10) || Sauerbeck (2–0) || Mills || — || 23,855 || 46–45
|- bgcolor="ffbbbb"
| 92 || July 19 || Dodgers || 7–12 || Dreifort || Silva (2–8) || — || 14,805 || 46–46
|- bgcolor="ffbbbb"
| 93 || July 20 || Dodgers || 4–8 || Brown || Clontz (0–3) || — || 16,921 || 46–47
|- bgcolor="ffbbbb"
| 94 || July 21 || @ Cubs || 1–2 || Aguilera || Christiansen (2–3) || — || 37,006 || 46–48
|- bgcolor="ffbbbb"
| 95 || July 22 || @ Cubs || 3–5 || Mulholland || Benson (7–8) || Adams || 37,112 || 46–49
|- bgcolor="ffbbbb"
| 96 || July 23 || @ Expos || 1–5 || Vazquez || Ritchie (9–7) || — || 7,510 || 46–50
|- bgcolor="ccffcc"
| 97 || July 24 || @ Expos || 7–2 || Schourek (3–5) || Powell || — || 13,396 || 47–50
|- bgcolor="ccffcc"
| 98 || July 25 || @ Expos || 6–1 || Schmidt (9–7) || Kline || — || 12,244 || 48–50
|- bgcolor="ffbbbb"
| 99 || July 26 || @ Mets || 5–7 || Reed || Cordova (5–5) || Wendell || 32,010 || 48–51
|- bgcolor="ccffcc"
| 100 || July 27 || @ Mets || 5–1 || Benson (8–8) || Hershiser || — || 36,337 || 49–51
|- bgcolor="ffbbbb"
| 101 || July 28 || @ Mets || 2–9 || Cook || Wilkins (2–1) || — || 42,920 || 49–52
|- bgcolor="ffbbbb"
| 102 || July 30 || Marlins || 7–8 || Edmondson || Hansell (1–1) || Alfonseca || 25,163 || 49–53
|- bgcolor="ccffcc"
| 103 || July 31 || Marlins || 4–2 || Schmidt (10–7) || Edmondson || Williams (15) || 33,862 || 50–53
|-

|- bgcolor="ccffcc"
| 104 || August 1 || Marlins || 2–1 || Cordova (6–5) || Fernandez || — || 19,071 || 51–53
|- bgcolor="ccffcc"
| 105 || August 3 || Braves || 7–1 || Benson (9–8) || Millwood || — || 17,154 || 52–53
|- bgcolor="ccffcc"
| 106 || August 4 || Braves || 3–2 || Ritchie (10–7) || Smoltz || Williams (16) || 17,625 || 53–53
|- bgcolor="ffbbbb"
| 107 || August 5 || Braves || 3–6 || Remlinger || Hansell (1–2) || Rocker || 19,078 || 53–54
|- bgcolor="ccffcc"
| 108 || August 6 || Cardinals || 5–1 || Anderson (1–0) || Jimenez || Silva (1) || — || 54–54
|- bgcolor="ffbbbb"
| 109 || August 6 || Cardinals || 1–5 || Stephenson || Schmidt (10–8) || Croushore || 35,521 || 54–55
|- bgcolor="ccffcc"
| 110 || August 7 || Cardinals || 3–1 || Cordova (7–5) || Bottenfield || Williams (17) || 41,063 || 55–55
|- bgcolor="ccffcc"
| 111 || August 8 || Cardinals || 5–1 || Benson (10–8) || Oliver || — || 31,780 || 56–55
|- bgcolor="ffbbbb"
| 112 || August 9 || Reds || 2–4 || Neagle || Ritchie (10–8) || Williamson || 13,423 || 56–56
|- bgcolor="ffbbbb"
| 113 || August 10 || Reds || 1–6 || Guzman || Schourek (3–6) || — || 13,306 || 56–57
|- bgcolor="ccffcc"
| 114 || August 11 || Reds || 5–4 || Williams (2–2) || Williamson || — || 23,728 || 57–57
|- bgcolor="ccffcc"
| 115 || August 13 || @ Astros || 6–5 (13) || Clontz (1–3) || Miller || Williams (18) || 39,829 || 58–57
|- bgcolor="ffbbbb"
| 116 || August 14 || @ Astros || 1–7 || Holt || Benson (10–9) || — || 44,868 || 58–58
|- bgcolor="ccffcc"
| 117 || August 15 || @ Astros || 2–0 || Ritchie (11–8) || Reynolds || Williams (19) || 36,231 || 59–58
|- bgcolor="ffbbbb"
| 118 || August 16 || @ Reds || 2–9 || Guzman || Schourek (3–7) || — || 19,693 || 59–59
|- bgcolor="ffbbbb"
| 119 || August 17 || @ Reds || 4–7 (12) || Graves || Williams (2–3) || — || 19,118 || 59–60
|- bgcolor="ccffcc"
| 120 || August 18 || @ Reds || 12–6 || Cordova (8–5) || Tomko || — || 19,733 || 60–60
|- bgcolor="ffbbbb"
| 121 || August 19 || @ Reds || 0–1 || Harnisch || Benson (10–10) || Williamson || 17,904 || 60–61
|- bgcolor="ccffcc"
| 122 || August 20 || Diamondbacks || 5–4 || Ritchie (12–8) || Stottlemyre || Williams (20) || 23,934 || 61–61
|- bgcolor="ffbbbb"
| 123 || August 21 || Diamondbacks || 2–4 || Johnson || Anderson (1–1) || — || 31,364 || 61–62
|- bgcolor="ffbbbb"
| 124 || August 22 || Diamondbacks || 5–7 || Daal || Schmidt (10–9) || Mantei || 25,112 || 61–63
|- bgcolor="ffbbbb"
| 125 || August 23 || Diamondbacks || 1–2 || Reynoso || Cordova (8–6) || Mantei || 11,768 || 61–64
|- bgcolor="ffbbbb"
| 126 || August 24 || Rockies || 2–3 || Leskanic || Williams (2–4) || Veres || 13,221 || 61–65
|- bgcolor="ccffcc"
| 127 || August 25 || Rockies || 9–3 || Peters (2–1) || Kile || — || 12,535 || 62–65
|- bgcolor="ccffcc"
| 128 || August 26 || Rockies || 8–4 || Anderson (2–1) || Astacio || — || 12,649 || 63–65
|- bgcolor="ccffcc"
| 129 || August 27 || @ Giants || 4–1 || Schmidt (11–9) || Nathan || Williams (21) || 16,390 || 64–65
|- bgcolor="ffbbbb"
| 130 || August 28 || @ Giants || 2–6 || Gardner || Cordova (8–7) || — || 32,783 || 64–66
|- bgcolor="ffbbbb"
| 131 || August 29 || @ Giants || 3–5 || Estes || Benson (10–11) || Nen || 34,020 || 64–67
|- bgcolor="ccffcc"
| 132 || August 30 || @ Rockies || 11–8 || Peters (3–1) || Ramirez || Williams (22) || 41,872 || 65–67
|- bgcolor="ccffcc"
| 133 || August 31 || @ Rockies || 9–8 (10) || Williams (3–4) || Lee || Silva (2) || 41,729 || 66–67
|-

|- bgcolor="ccffcc"
| 134 || September 1 || @ Rockies || 9–8 || Sauerbeck (3–0) || Veres || Clontz (1) || 40,529 || 67–67
|- bgcolor="ffbbbb"
| 135 || September 3 || Giants || 2–12 || Estes || Cordova (8–8) || — || 16,478 || 67–68
|- bgcolor="ffbbbb"
| 136 || September 4 || Giants || 2–9 || Ortiz || Benson (10–12) || — || 19,949 || 67–69
|- bgcolor="ccffcc"
| 137 || September 5 || Giants || 8–4 || Peters (4–1) || Rueter || — || 17,901 || 68–69
|- bgcolor="ffbbbb"
| 138 || September 6 || Padres || 3–4 || Ashby || Ritchie (12–9) || Hoffman || 16,663 || 68–70
|- bgcolor="ccffcc"
| 139 || September 7 || Padres || 3–1 || Schmidt (12–9) || Hitchcock || Silva (3) || 11,058 || 69–70
|- bgcolor="ffbbbb"
| 140 || September 8 || Padres || 4–7 (10) || Hoffman || Wilkins (2–2) || — || 10,133 || 69–71
|- bgcolor="ffbbbb"
| 141 || September 10 || @ Cardinals || 5–11 || Bottenfield || Benson (10–13) || — || 36,590 || 69–72
|- bgcolor="ccffcc"
| 142 || September 11 || @ Cardinals || 8–5 || Peters (5–1) || Jimenez || Silva (4) || 46,011 || 70–72
|- bgcolor="ffbbbb"
| 143 || September 13 || @ Diamondbacks || 1–5 || Daal || Schmidt (12–10) || Chouinard || 32,147 || 70–73
|- bgcolor="ffbbbb"
| 144 || September 14 || @ Diamondbacks || 1–2 || Swindell || Wilkins (2–3) || Mantei || 30,372 || 70–74
|- bgcolor="ccffcc"
| 145 || September 15 || @ Diamondbacks || 5–1 || Benson (11–13) || Reynoso || — || 31,294 || 71–74
|- bgcolor="ccffcc"
| 146 || September 17 || Reds || 3–1 || Ritchie (13–9) || Villone || Sauerbeck (1) || 21,853 || 72–74
|- bgcolor="ffbbbb"
| 147 || September 18 || Reds || 0–3 || Parris || Peters (5–2) || — || 21,253 || 72–75
|- bgcolor="ccffcc"
| 148 || September 19 || Reds || 8–5 || Schmidt (13–10) || Harnisch || Clontz (2) || 21,183 || 73–75
|- bgcolor="ccffcc"
| 149 || September 20 || Astros || 11–5 || Schourek (4–7) || Reynolds || — || 10,256 || 74–75
|- bgcolor="ffbbbb"
| 150 || September 21 || Astros || 3–6 || Elarton || Benson (11–14) || Henry || 12,745 || 74–76
|- bgcolor="ccffcc"
| 151 || September 22 || Astros || 3–2 || Ritchie (14–9) || Lima || — || 16,647 || 75–76
|- bgcolor="ffbbbb"
| 152 || September 23 || @ Cubs || 5–8 || Bowie || Peters (5–3) || Aguilera || 36,736 || 75–77
|- bgcolor="ffbbbb"
| 153 || September 24 || @ Cubs || 0–9 || Farnsworth || Schmidt (13–11) || — || 29,267 || 75–78
|- bgcolor="ffbbbb"
| 154 || September 25 || @ Cubs || 1–3 || Lieber || Cordova (8–9) || — || 39,035 || 75–79
|- bgcolor="ccffcc"
| 155 || September 26 || @ Cubs || 8–4 (11) || Sauerbeck (4–0) || Guthrie || — || 39,663 || 76–79
|- bgcolor="ccffcc"
| 156 || September 29 || @ Brewers || 7–5 || Ritchie (15–9) || Woodard || Williams (23) || — || 77–79
|- bgcolor="ffbbbb"
| 157 || September 29 || @ Brewers || 2–5 || Bere || Peters (5–4) || Wickman || 12,464 || 77–80
|- bgcolor="ccffcc"
| 158 || September 30 || @ Brewers || 3–2 || Garcia (1–0) || Nomo || Sauerbeck (2) || 12,319 || 78–80
|-

|- bgcolor="ffbbbb"
| 159 || October 1 || @ Mets || 2–3 (11) || Mahomes || Sauerbeck (4–1) || — || 29,528 || 78–81
|- bgcolor="ffbbbb"
| 160 || October 2 || @ Mets || 0–7 || Reed || Cordova (8–10) || — || 36,878 || 78–82
|- bgcolor="ffbbbb"
| 161 || October 3 || @ Mets || 1–2 || Benitez || Hansell (1–3) || — || 50,111 || 78–83
|-

|-
| Legend:       = Win       = LossBold = Pittsburgh Pirates team member

Record vs. opponents

Detailed records

Roster

Opening Day lineup

Player stats
Batting
Note: G = Games played; AB = At bats; H = Hits; Avg. = Batting average; HR = Home runs; RBI = Runs batted in

Pitching
Note: G = Games pitched; IP = Innings pitched; W = Wins; L = Losses; ERA = Earned run average; SO = Strikeouts

Awards and honors

1999 Major League Baseball All-Star Game
Ed Sprague Jr., 3B, reserve

Notable transactions
 May 17, 1999: Dale Sveum was signed as a free agent by the Pirates.
 July 23, 1999: José Guillén and Jeff Sparks were traded by the Pirates to the Tampa Bay Devil Rays for Joe Oliver and Humberto Cota.

Farm system

References

 1999 Pittsburgh Pirates at Baseball Reference
 1999 Pittsburgh Pirates at Baseball Almanac

Pittsburgh Pirates seasons
Pittsburgh Pirates season
Pitts